"I'm Lying on the Beach" (Ya lezhu na plyazhe) is a song by Russian child singer Alisa Kozhikina. She released it as a digital single in 2015, at the age of 12.

Critical reception 
 writer Alexey Mazhayev praises the song for its universality with regard to performer's age. He also notes that "Alisa manages to perform this seemingly children's fun summer song as if she already imagines how she will sing it in 15 years or so. This not to say that Alisa Kozhikina in any way mimics adult singers, she remains herself."

Charts

References 

2015 singles
Alisa Kozhikina songs
2015 songs